Dinwiddie Presbyterian Church and Cemetery is a historic Presbyterian church located near Hillsville, Carroll County, Virginia. It was one of the six "rock churches" founded by Bob Childress It was built in 1948, and is a white quartz rock-faced frame building.  The main block is front-gabled with nave plan and Gothic-style tower at the front, through which the edifice is entered. The tower has corner parapets with crenellations of jagged, light-colored stone fragments between each corner. Attached to the main block is a 1 -story, front-gabled addition. The contributing cemetery is enclosed by white quartz pillars connected by black pipes.

It was added to the National Register of Historic Places in 2007.

See also
Bluemont Presbyterian Church and Cemetery
Buffalo Mountain Presbyterian Church and Cemetery
Mayberry Presbyterian Church
Slate Mountain Presbyterian Church and Cemetery
Willis Presbyterian Church and Cemetery

External links
Stone Churches of Reverend Bob Childress

References

Gothic Revival church buildings in Virginia
Churches completed in 1948
Churches in Carroll County, Virginia
Churches on the National Register of Historic Places in Virginia
Protestant Reformed cemeteries
Presbyterian churches in Virginia
National Register of Historic Places in Carroll County, Virginia